Aleksei Vladimirovich Belkin (born 25 November 1981) is a former Russian professional football player.

Club career
He played two seasons in the Russian Football National League for FC Tom Tomsk and FC Oryol.

References

External links
 

1981 births
Living people
Russian footballers
Association football goalkeepers
FC Torpedo Moscow players
FC Dynamo Vologda players
FC Tom Tomsk players
FC Oryol players
FC Chernomorets Novorossiysk players
FC Lukhovitsy players
FC Astana players
Kazakhstan Premier League players
Russian expatriate footballers
Expatriate footballers in Kazakhstan